Rafael Nadal was the defending champion but withdrew with a knee injury before the tournament began. 

Nikoloz Basilashvili won the title, defeating Juan Martín del Potro in the final, 6–4, 6–4.

Seeds

Draw

Finals

Top half

Bottom half

Qualifying

Seeds

Qualifiers

Lucky loser

Qualifying draw

First qualifier

Second qualifier

Third qualifier

Fourth qualifier

References

External links
 Main draw
 Qualifying draw

2018 ATP World Tour
2018 China Open (tennis)